George S. Fields (July 26, 1852 – September 22, 1933) was an American professional baseball player who played as a third baseman during the 1872 season for the Middletown Mansfields in the National Association.

Notes

References

External links

1852 births
1933 deaths
Major League Baseball third basemen
Middletown Mansfields players
Baseball players from Connecticut
19th-century baseball players
Sportspeople from Waterbury, Connecticut